Elena Ovchinnikova may refer to:

 Elena Chebukina (Ovchinnikova), Russian volleyball player
 Yelena Ovchinnikova, Russian synchronized swimmer